KCIG-LP (99.7 FM) is a low-power FM radio station licensed to Craig, Colorado, United States. The station is currently owned by State of Colorado Telecommunication Services.
The station provides Craig, Colorado, with local NOAA Weather alerts, since coverage in the area is limited. The nearest NOAA Weather Radio station is in Steamboat Springs, Colorado.

References

External links
 

CIG-LP
CIG-LP
Radio stations established in 2002
2002 establishments in Colorado